John Newton Waddel (born Willington, South Carolina, April 2, 1812; died 1895) was the Chancellor of the University of Mississippi from 1865 to 1874.

Biography
Waddel was the son of Moses Waddel and Eliza Woodson Waddel. He was a graduate of the University of Georgia (1829). He worked as a cotton farmer in Alabama, taught at the Willington Academy in South Carolina, and established the Montrose Academy in Jasper County, Mississippi. A Presbyterian minister, he preached to the Confederate Army during the American Civil War. He also taught at Synodical College. He then became the Chair of the Ancient Languages Department at the University of Mississippi in Oxford. From 1865 to 1874, he served as its chancellor. He resigned to become secretary of education for the Presbyterian Church of the United States.

Waddel was married to Martha A. Robertson in 1832.

Bibliography
Memorials of academic life: being an historical sketch of the Waddel family, identified through three generations with the history of the higher education in the South and Southwest (1891)

References

American Presbyterians
People from Willington, South Carolina
University of Georgia alumni
University of Mississippi people
Classical scholars of the University of Mississippi
1812 births
1895 deaths
People from Jasper County, Mississippi